Kohlschwarz is a former municipality in the district of Voitsberg in the Austrian state of Styria. Since the 2015 Styria municipal structural reform, it is part of the municipality Kainach bei Voitsberg.

Geography
Kohlschwarz lies west of Graz.

References

Cities and towns in Voitsberg District